A Handful of Time (En håndfull tid) is a 1989 Norwegian film directed by Martin Asphaug. Starring Espen Skjønberg, Camilla Strøm-Henriksen, Nicolay Lange-Nielsen and Bjørn Sundquist, the film also features Susannah York and Nigel Hawthorne. The film was selected as the Norwegian entry for the Best Foreign Language Film at the 62nd Academy Awards, but was not accepted as a nominee.

Plot
The elderly Martin believes he hears the voice of Anna, the love of his youth, who died during childbirth fifty years before. Guided by her voice, Martin escapes from his nursery home and begins a journey that echoes a chain of fatal events from his past, which increasingly merge with the present.

Awards
 Winner of the "Best Film" award at the Amanda awards in 1990.
 Camilla Strøm-Henriksen, winner of the "Best Actress" award at the Amanda awards in 1990.
The Norwegian entry to the Academy Award for Best Foreign Language Film in 1990.
 1990 Rouen Festival du cinéma Nordique, Prix A.C.O.R. 
 1990 Rouen Festival du cinéma Nordique, Prix de la presse

See also
 List of submissions to the 62nd Academy Awards for Best Foreign Language Film
 List of Norwegian submissions for the Academy Award for Best Foreign Language Film

References

 En håndfull tid dossier  Norwegian Film Institute

Footnotes

External links
 

1990 films
Norwegian drama films
Norwegian-language films